John Gennings (c. 1570 – 12 November 1660) was an Englishman who was converted to Catholicism through the martyrdom of his elder brother Saint Edmund Gennings during the English Reformation. He restored the English province of Franciscan friars. His name is sometimes spelled Jennings.

Martyrdom of Edmund Gennings
Edmund Gennings converted to Catholicism at the age of about sixteen, and soon after went to Rheims to study for the priesthood. On returning to England, he met his younger brother, John, near Ludgate Hill, and spoke to him without disclosing his identity. He said merely that he was a kinsman, and asked the young man what had become of his brother Edmund. John told him that "He had heard he was gone to Rome to the Pope, and was become a notable Papist and a traitor both to God and his country, and that if he did return he would be hanged infallibly." Edmund, not judging the time right to begin an attempt at converting his brother, told him who he was, but without mentioning his priesthood. The brothers separated soon after, and Edmund continued his short ministry until he was arrested on 7 November 1591, after saying Mass in the house of Swithun Wells at Gray's Inn. He was hanged, drawn, and quartered on 10 December, outside that house.

Conversion of John Gennings
John Gennings, who subsequently wrote a Life of his brother, recounts his own conversion through his brother's martyrdom. On page 98, of the Life (which was published in 1614 at Saint-Omer), speaking of himself in the third person, he writes,

Being received into the Church, he entered Douai College, was ordained as a priest in 1607, and the following year was sent upon the English mission. Here he conceived a wish for the restoration of the English province of Franciscans, and sought out Father William Staney, the Commissary of the English friars, and from him received the habit (became a Franciscan), either in 1610 or 1614 (the date is uncertain). After this, he went for a time to a convent of the Franciscan order at Ypres, in Flanders, where he was joined by several English companions, amongst whom was Christopher Davenport, known in religion as Franciscus a Sancta Clara, afterwards a famous controversialist. Thus was the foundation of a new English province laid, and Father William Staney recognising the zeal of John Gennings, now gave into his hands the seal of the old province of the English Observants.

The Restoration of the English Franciscans
Gennings next proceeded to procure a house for the English friars at Gravelines, but in 1618 he obtained leave from the minister general to establish a settlement at Douai. As a matter of fact, most of the friars who had joined Gennings were graduates of Douai College, and in transferring the residence to that town he hoped to obtain a continuous supply of recruits.

The work of restoring the English province was definitely entrusted to him by the general chapter of 1618, and he was nominated "Vicar of England". To assist him in the work of restoration, the commissary general of the Belgian nation was empowered to gather together all the English and Scottish friars from any province in the order. A decree of the same general chapter placed the English Poor Clares of Gravelines under the jurisdiction of English friars.

Custos
In 1625, the number of the English friars having greatly increased, Gennings sent Father Franciscus a Sancta Clara to Rome to plead (to provide an argument for) that the English province be canonically established (i.e. accepted according to Canon law). The request was granted with the simple restriction that the superior of the province should not assume the title of provincial, but that of custos.

Establishment of the Convent at Taunton
In 1629, this restriction was taken away and Friar John Gennings was appointed minister provincial. The first chapter of the new province was held at Brussels in Advent (roughly, December) of the same year, in the convent of the English sisters of the third order, which Gennings had himself founded in 1619. This community of tertiary sisters was established at Taunton, in England, with a branch house at Woodchester. Father John Gennings was re-elected provincial in 1634, and again in 1643. John Gennings died in Douai on 12 November 1660.

Notes
Catholic Where Catholic is used in the article it refers to Roman Catholic. Catholic (on its own) has been mainly used in the article to aid the flow and to remain true to the primary source.
Franciscans More correctly, Order of Friars Minor
Observants. Such a vigorous and sturdy order as the Franciscans were bound to develop various strands. The central point of division over the ages was the extent to which the austere (severe?) regime laid down by the Saint need be followed. There was usually a distinction made by those followers who wished to retain the austerity of Francis, the Observants were such a group. See Franciscans for a wider treatment of this and a description of Francis' Testament
Custos, A superior in the Franciscan order, also used in England as guardian.
Sisters of the Third Order The Sisters have traditionally divided into two branches, one an enclosed contemplative order, the other, the Third Order, an 'open' order who undertook such work as teaching, nursing, or the Missions. They should not be confused with the male Third Order, which St Francis created for those of his followers who could not leave their homes.
Wider View See Franciscan Order in modern times for a wider view of which this English Restoration is but a part.

External links
Catholic Encyclopedia: Edmund and John Jennings
North West Catholic History Society: The Recusant Historian's Handbook

Sources
Richard Challoner: Memoirs of Missionary Priests
Encyclopædia Britannica, 15th Edition

1570s births
1660 deaths
Converts to Roman Catholicism
16th-century English Roman Catholic priests
English Franciscans
17th-century English Roman Catholic priests
16th-century English people